At Last...The Duets Album is the second cover album and thirteenth studio album by saxophonist Kenny G. It was released by Arista Records in 2004, and reached number 1 on the Contemporary Jazz chart, number 21 on the Top R&B/Hip-Hop Albums chart and number 40 on the Billboard 200.

Track listing 
 "(Everything I Do) I Do It for You" - featuring LeAnn Rimes (Bryan Adams/Michael Kamen/Robert John Lange) - 5:04
 "At Last" - featuring Arturo Sandoval (Harry Warren/Mack Gordon) - 4:06
 "I Believe I Can Fly" - featuring Yolanda Adams (R. Kelly) - 5:19
 "Careless Whisper" - featuring Brian McKnight (Andrew Ridgeley/George Michael) - 4:17
 "Beautiful" - featuring Chaka Khan (Linda Perry) - 5:32
 "Pick Up the Pieces" - featuring David Sanborn (Alan Gorrie/Owen McIntyre/Roger Ball/Malcolm Duncan/Robbie McIntosh/Hamish Stuart) - 4:13
 "Baby Come to Me" - featuring Daryl Hall (Rod Temperton) - 3:56
 "Misty" - featuring Gladys Knight (Johnny Burke/Erroll Garner) - 4:31
 "Don't Know Why" - featuring David Benoit (Jesse Harris) - 5:08
 "The Way You Move" - featuring Earth, Wind & Fire (Antwan Patton/Carlton Mahone/Patrick Brown) - 4:41
 "Sorry Seems to Be the Hardest Word" - featuring Richard Marx (Elton John/Bernie Taupin) - 3:54
 "Alfie" - featuring Burt Bacharach (Burt Bacharach/Hal David) - 4:10
 "The Music That Makes Me Dance" - featuring Barbra Streisand (Jule Styne/Bob Merrill) - 4:30

Personnel 
 Kenny G – soprano saxophone, alto saxophone, and tenor saxophone
 Walter Afanasieff – keyboards (1-5, 7-12), acoustic piano (1-5), rhythm programming (1-5, 7-12), arrangements (1-12), Hammond B3 organ (6, 9, 10)
 Emanuel Kiriakou – programming (1-12), guitar (6), electric guitar (10)
 David Benoit – acoustic piano (9)
 Greg Phillinganes – Fender Rhodes (9)
 T-Bone Wolk – accordion (11)
 Burt Bacharach – acoustic piano (12)
 Michael Lang – acoustic piano (13)
 Michael Landau – electric guitar (1, 3, 4, 5, 7, 9), guitar (6)
 Earl Klugh – guitar (4)
 Dean Parks – guitar (13)
 Nathan East – bass (6)
 Abe Laboriel, Jr. – drums (6)
 Vinnie Colaiuta – drums (9)
 Ralph Humphrey – drums (13)
 Peter Michael Escovedo – percussion (10)
 David Sanborn – alto saxophone (6)
 Gary Bias – saxophone (10)
 Reggie Young – trombone (10)
 Arturo Sandoval – trumpet (2)
 Gary Grant – trumpet (10)
 Jerry Hey – trumpet (10), horn arrangements (10)
 William Ross – string arrangements and conductor (2, 8, 13)
 Jorge Calandrelli – string arrangements and conductor (12)
 Ralph Burns – original Broadway arrangement (13)
 Debbie Datz-Pyle – string contractor (2, 8, 12)
 Patti Zimmitti – string contractor (2, 8, 12)
 LeAnn Rimes – lead vocals (1)
 Yolanda Adams – lead vocals (3)
 Mabvuto Carpenter – backing vocals (3, 7)
 Traci Nelson – backing vocals (3)
 Conshea Owens – backing vocals (3, 4, 5, 7)
 Barbara Wilson – backing vocals (3)
 Namiah Wilson – backing vocals (3)
 Brian McKnight – lead vocals (4)
 Clark Anderson – backing vocals (4)
 Chaka Khan – lead vocals (5)
 Dorian Holley – backing vocals (5)
 Darryl Phinnessee – backing vocals (5)
 Daryl Hall – lead vocals (7)
 Gladys Knight – lead vocals (8)
 Philip Bailey – lead vocals (10)
 Maurice White – lead vocals (10)
 Richard Marx – lead vocals (11)
 Barbra Streisand – lead vocals (13)

Production 
 Executive Producers – Clive Davis (Tracks 1-12); Barbra Streisand and Jay Landers (Track 13).
 Producers – Walter Afanasieff (Tracks 1-12); Barbra Streisand (Track 13).
 Co-Producers – Emanuel Kiriakou (Track 1); Raphael Saadiq (Track 10).
 Saxophone produced by Kenny G
 Engineers – Emanuel Kiriakou and Steve Shepherd (Tracks 1-12); David Channing and Jonathan Duckett (Track 6); David Reitzas and Al Schmitt (Track 13).
 Additional Engineer on Tracks 2 & 12 – David Channing 
 Assistant Engineers – Kaspar Hugentobler (Tracks 1, 3-7 & 9-12); Alan Mason (Tracks 3, 5 & 12); Jon Berkowitz (Track 6).
 Strings on Tracks 2 & 8 recorded by Joel Iwataki
 Lead vocals on Track 4 recorded by Chris Wood 
 Horns on Track 10 recorded by David Channing 
 ProTools Engineer on Tracks 1-12 – Emanuel Kiriakou
 Additional ProTools Engineers  – John Hanes (Track 2); Joe Wohlmuth (Tracks 4 & 8).
 Mixing – Andy Zulla (Tracks 1, 3, 5, 7 & 9); Serban Ghenea (Track 2); Jon Gass (Tracks 4 & 12); Dave Pensado (Tracks 6 & 10); Mick Guzauski (Tracks 8 & 11); David Reitzas (Track 13).
 Mix Assistants – Tim Roberts (Track 2); Ariel Chobaz (Track 10).
 Mastered by Joe Yannece
 A&R – Pete Ganberg
 Production Coordinator – Rich Davis
 Art Department Production – Chris LeBeau
 Art Direction and Design – Alexis Yraola
 Photography – Andrew MacPherson
 Management – Dennis Turner

 Studios 
 Recorded at Chalice Recording Studios, Signet Sound Studios and Studio G (Los Angeles, CA); Henson Recording Studios, Blakeslee Studios and Paramount Recording Studios (Hollywood, CA); Hiatus Studios (New York, NY).
 Mixed at Sound Decision (New York, NY); Barking Doctor Recording (Mount Kisco, NY); MixStar Studios (Virginia Beach, VA); The Enterprise (Burbank, CA).
 Mastered at Trutrone Mastering Labs (New York, NY).

Bonus track listing No. 1
 "The One and Only - featuring Lee-Hom Wang" (Lee-Hom Wang) - 4:20 (Bonus)
 "Misty Moon - featuring Lim Hyung Joo" (Lim Hyung Joo/T. Matsumoto) - 4:32 (Bonus)
 "I Need the Both of You - featuring Tata Young" (Du, Pas Sa/Kamo) - 4:34 (Bonus)
 "Propose - featuring Tube" (Michiya Haruhata/Nobuteru Maeda) - 5:22 (Bonus)

Bonus track listing No. 2
 "January - featuring Glenn Fredly" (Glenn Fredly) - 3:51 (Bonus)

Bonus track listing No. 3
 "Right Here Waiting" (Richard Marx) - 4:22 (Bonus)

Singles 
Information taken from this source.

Others 
In Indonesia, a collaboration with the Indonesian singer Glenn Fredly is included on the album. The song "Januari" (January) appears as track 14.

References 

2004 albums
Albums produced by Emanuel Kiriakou
Albums produced by Raphael Saadiq
Albums produced by Walter Afanasieff
Arista Records albums
Covers albums
Kenny G albums
Vocal–instrumental duet albums